The Shapiro TS Severity Scale (STSS) is a psychological measure used to briefly assess severity of tics.

References 

Mental disorders screening and assessment tools
Tourette syndrome